River Ridge Community Unit School District 210 is a school district headquartered in Jo Daviess County, Illinois. In addition to the district serves Elizabeth and Hanover.

 it has about 53 teachers and other certified employees, 40 non-certified employees, and 525 students.

History
The district's current building opened in August 2003.

Schools
It operates River Ridge Elementary School, River Ridge Middle School, and River Ridge High School.

References

External links
 

School districts in Illinois
Education in Jo Daviess County, Illinois